Matt Watts (born May 31, 1975) is a Canadian comedian, actor and writer, best known for his work on Ken Finkleman's The Newsroom.

He was a writer, executive producer and the star of the Canadian television sitcom Michael, Tuesdays and Thursdays, which debuted on CBC Television in September 2011. Watts worked for CBC Radio One, writing and performing in the dramas Steve, The First, its sequel Steve, The Second and Canadia: 2056 and was co-creator and co-star of the  web series The Writers' Block. He is credited as a writer and consulting producer on The Kids in the Hall 2022 eight-episode season on Amazon Prime.

References

External links
Matt Watts

1975 births
Living people
Canadian male comedians
Canadian male television actors
Canadian male television writers
Canadian sketch comedians
Canadian television writers
Canadian male voice actors
Comedians from Toronto
Male actors from Toronto
Writers from Scarborough, Toronto
20th-century Canadian male actors
21st-century Canadian male actors